The Pontins Open events were a series of pro–am snooker tournaments which ran from 1974 until 2011.

History
From the early 1970s, top professionals had supplemented their income entertaining and coaching holiday makers on the holiday camp circuit and at Pontin's in particular. That organisation organised several Snooker Festivals at which ordinary members of the public could join with top amateurs and the best professionals in open tournaments. 
  
The first of these events was held in 1974 and eight top professionals were invited to take part in the Pontins Professional (which ended in 2000) while many others joined them in the Open event where up to 1000 hopefuls would set out with the chance to meet one of their idols in the later rounds. The most important of these festivals was the Pontins Spring Open held at Prestatyn, Wales. A similar Open event, the Pontins Autumn Open was held later in the year and attracted almost as many top names as the spring event. 
  
The professionals had to concede up to 25 points per frame to the amateurs (this figure varied over the years) and this format meant that many of the star names fell to good amateurs. In the earlier years nearly all the top players took part but as the number of tour events increased very few entered in later years.
  
The Autumn Open ended in 2009 and the Spring Open ended in 2011 and the festival in later years also hosted the final Challenge Tour event where players battle for places on the main tour in the following season.

A later event which began in 2006, the Pontins World Series consisted of six qualifying events, open to amateurs and main tour professionals and was played in the summer and autumn. Points were awarded for each event with the best five results counting towards a merit table. The leading 64 players qualified to play in the series final. This tournament ran for four editions ending in 2009.

Finals

Pontins Spring Open

Pontins Autumn Open

Pontins World Series

References

 
Recurring sporting events established in 1974
Recurring events disestablished in 2011
1974 establishments in Wales
2011 disestablishments in Wales
Snooker competitions in Wales
Defunct snooker competitions
Defunct sports competitions in Wales